The Bugatti Gangloff  is a virtual concept car. Its designer, Paul Czyżewski took inspiration from the 1938 Type 57 SC Atalante Coupe, which was designed by a French coach builder, Gangloff. The concept takes many cues from the Bugatti Veyron.

References

External links

Bugatti concept vehicles